Hennepin Township is located in Putnam County, Illinois. As of the 2010 census, its population was 1,261 and it contained 573 housing units.

Geography

Demographics

References

External links
City-data.com
Illinois State Archives

Townships in Putnam County, Illinois
1855 establishments in Illinois
Townships in Illinois